Torpedo Wharf is a wharf in the Presidio of San Francisco, in the U.S. state of California. The site has been a wharf since 1854, and earned its current name when the United States Army built a naval mine depot . The current wharf was established in 1941, and now serves as a popular tourist destination.

Fishing
Primary species caught at the pier:

References

External links

 

Presidio of San Francisco
Tourist attractions in San Francisco
Wharves in the United States